The Bruno Creek Tailings Impoundment is a tailings dam on Bruno Creek,  southwest of Challis in Custer County, Idaho. It serves to store tailings for the nearby Thompson Creek Mine. The dam is mainly composed of cycloned sand. The downstream slope of the dam will be steepened from 3:1 to 2.75:1. In 1994, it was discovered that acid mine drainage had been forming on the embankment since 1987. Since seepage does occur at the dam, a system of wells was installed to monitor groundwater and a seepage return dam was constructed downstream.

References

Dams in Idaho
Tailings dams
Buildings and structures in Custer County, Idaho
Dams completed in 1983
Mining in Idaho